The historic county of Cambridgeshire, located in the modern-day East of England region, has been represented in Parliament since the 13th century. This article provides the list of constituencies which have formed the parliamentary representation from Cambridgeshire.

In 1889 the historic county was divided between the administrative counties of Cambridgeshire and Isle of Ely. The two administrative counties merged in 1965 to form Cambridgeshire and Isle of Ely. In 1974 Cambridgeshire and Isle of Ely was merged with Huntingdon and Peterborough to form a new expanded non-metropolitan county of Cambridgeshire. Huntingdonshire was a historic and administrative county in its own right, whereas the Soke of Peterborough had been an administrative county which was part of the historic county of Northamptonshire.

This article covers only the constituencies wholly or predominantly within the area of the historic county of Cambridgeshire, both before and after the administrative changes of 1889, 1965 and 1974. Constituencies predominantly within the area of the historic county of Huntingdonshire are listed at Parliamentary representation from Huntingdonshire. For more information on the constituencies currently covering the modern-day ceremonial county of Cambridgeshire, see List of parliamentary constituencies in Cambridgeshire.

List of constituencies

Key to abbreviations:

Type: 
BC: Borough constituency
CC: County constituency
UC: University constituency.

Notes:
C1: historic county of Cambridgeshire (until 1889)
C2: administrative county of Cambridgeshire (1889–1974)
C3: non-metropolitan/ceremonial county of Cambridgeshire  (from 1974)
IE: administrative county of the Isle of Ely (1889–1974).

Note: Dates of representation prior to 1654 are provisional. The constituencies which existed in 1707 were previously represented in the Parliament of England.

North West Cambridgeshire does not include any part of the historic county of Cambridgeshire. It combines parts of the historic counties of Huntingdonshire and Northamptonshire.

Constituencies wholly or predominantly in the historic county

Periods constituencies represented

Summaries

Summary of Constituencies by Type and Period

Summary of Members of Parliament by Type and Period

See also
 Wikipedia:Index of article on UK Parliament constituencies in England
 Wikipedia:Index of articles on UK Parliament constituencies in England N-Z
 Parliamentary representation by historic counties
 First Protectorate Parliament
 Unreformed House of Commons

References
 Boundaries of Parliamentary Constituencies 1885-1972, compiled and edited by F.W.S. Craig (Parliamentary Reference Publications 1972)
 British Parliamentary Constituencies: A Statistical Compendium, by Ivor Crewe and Anthony Fox (Faber and Faber 1984)
 British Parliamentary Election Results 1832-1885, compiled and edited by F.W.S. Craig (The Macmillan Press 1977)
 The House of Commons 1509-1558, by S.T. Bindoff (Secker & Warburg 1982)
 The House of Commons 1558-1603, by P.W. Hasler (HMSO 1981)
 The House of Commons 1660-1690, by Basil Duke Henning (Secker & Warburg 1983)
 The House of Commons 1715-1754, by Romney Sedgwick (HMSO 1970)
 The House of Commons 1754-1790, by Sir Lewis Namier and John Brooke (HMSO 1964)
 The House of Commons 1790-1820, by R.G. Thorne (Secker & Warburg 1986)
 The Parliaments of England by Henry Stooks Smith (1st edition published in three volumes 1844–50), second edition edited (in one volume) by F.W.S. Craig (Political Reference Publications 1973) out of copyright

Cambridgeshire, Historic county of
Politics of Cambridgeshire